The flag of Piauí is one of the official symbols to the state of Piauí, in Brazil.

History
The flag was adopted by the Lei nº 1.050, promulgada em 24 de julho de 1922, but was amended by the Lei ordinária no 5.507, de 17 de novembro de 2005.

Vexilology
Its drawing consists of a rectangle with the proportions 7:3, divided in thirteen interspersed green and yellow stripes with the same length. In the upper right corner there is a dark blue canton with the length equal to five stripes with a white star in the middle. Below the star, it is written with white letters: "13 DE MARÇO DE 1823" (March 13, 1823)

Colors
The colors used on the flag (green, yellow, blue and white), don't have an official shading level. However, the manual of visual identity of the government of the Piauí state specifies the following colors:

Symbolism
The main colors of the flag are the same as in the Flag of Brazil and are one representation of the integration of the state with Brazil. Each color has a specific meaning:
Yellow represents the mineral wealth;
Green represents hope.
Alongside the colors, other elements in the flag also represent:
The star represents Antares, which in the Brazilian flag symbolizes the state of Piauí;
The inscription inside the blue rectangle: "13 DE MARÇO DE 1823", introduced in the 2005 change of the flag, was the day of the Battle of Jenipapo, in the state's territory.

Historical flags

References

Flags of Brazil
Flags introduced in 2005
2005 establishments in Brazil
Piauí